The Shuinan Economic and Trade Park is an industrial park in Xitun District, Taichung, Taiwan.

History
The industrial park was built on the former Taichung Shuinan Airport site, which also included decommissioned air force base and agricultural lands. The construction of the was completed in 2004. The park was created by Stan Allen Architects in collaboration with the city of Taichung, Taiwan. The park utilizes a variety of techniques for salvaging the grey site into a usable urban space.

Architecture
The industrial park spans over an area of 250 hectares and consists of cultural district, college town and canal district. The park was designed by Stan Allen Architects.

See also
 Economy of Taiwan
 Taichung’s 7th Redevelopment Zone

References

2004 establishments in Taiwan
Buildings and structures completed in 2004
Buildings and structures in Taichung
Industrial parks in Taiwan